ElonJet is a service that uses social media accounts to track the real-time private airplane usage of Elon Musk. The service, created and provided by Jack Sweeney using public data, has accounts on Facebook, Instagram, Telegram, Truth Social, Mastodon, and formerly on Twitter, where the Twitter account once had about 530,000 followers, before being suspended. Several of the social media accounts use the handle @elonjet.

The Twitter account, created in June 2020, had been targeted by Musk beginning in 2021. He offered to pay Sweeney $5,000; Sweeney countered requesting $50,000 or an internship in one of Musk's companies, and offered advice on restricting flight tracking data. Musk blocked Sweeney in January 2021. In late 2022, after Musk purchased Twitter, he announced he would not ban the ElonJet account. The account was restricted in December and then blocked, along with Sweeney's personal and other flight tracking accounts, as part of the December 2022 Twitter account suspensions.

On December 22, 2022, Sweeney started the new @ElonJetNextDay Twitter account, which continues to track the flights of Elon Musk's private jets, but publishes flight location information on a 24-hour delay in compliance with twitter's new rules that "sharing publicly available location information after a reasonable time has elapsed, so that the individual is no longer at risk for physical harm" is not a violation.

Function
The ElonJet service uses publicly available flight data as well as an automated computer program, a Twitter bot, to report Elon Musk's flights. The service utilizes ADS-B data, publicly available records, to give general details about where and when Musk's private jet was taking off and landing, though it cannot indicate who is on board or where the passengers travel before or after the flight. The Twitter account in particular became a reliable way for Musk's investors, fans, and critics to determine his whereabouts, often between the Austin area where he lives, the San Francisco Bay area where Tesla's factory is, and Southern California, where SpaceX is headquartered.

, the ElonJet service is hosted on Facebook, Instagram, Telegram, and Mastodon accounts, and formerly a Twitter account. The Mastodon account was created on December 14, 2022, a day after the Twitter account was suspended. Sweeney has earned a few thousand dollars with the accounts, via ad revenue, allowing him to upgrade his computer. A subreddit dedicated to the service, r/ElonJetTracker, gained over 40,000 members in the two days since it was created on December 14, becoming one of the fastest-growing subreddits on the website.

History
The ElonJet Twitter account was started in June 2020 by Florida student Jack Sweeney. At the time, he was a high school senior, with his education suspended during the COVID-19 pandemic lockdown. Sweeney considered himself a fan of Musk's work at SpaceX and Tesla, leading him to start the account.

Elon Musk has had issues with the account for a long time, and offered Jack Sweeney $5,000 to delete the account in 2021. Sweeney countered asking for $50,000, saying he would use the money for college and possibly to buy a Tesla Model 3. Their last exchange was in January 2022, when Musk said it wouldn't feel right to pay in order to shut the account down. Sweeney asked about the possibility of an internship at one of Musk's companies, and offered Musk advice, including about a federal privacy program to vary the ID his transponder beamed out, thus blocking flight tracking programs. Musk began using the program, though Sweeney remained able to track Musk's flights. Musk blocked Sweeney sometime after January 23.

Musk purchased Twitter in October 2022, and announced early in the next month that he would not ban the ElonJet account, as he is an advocate for free speech, despite a "direct personal safety risk". On December 10, Sweeney shared his discovery that the Twitter account had been shadow banned, where Twitter intentionally limits the account's reach within the site. Twitter's Trust and Safety Council vice president asked to place "heavy visibility filtering" on the account. The council was disbanded on December 12, and that day Sweeney reported that the account no longer seemed hidden in any way.

On the morning of December 14, the social media site suspended the ElonJet account. Later that day, it was briefly reinstated and accessible, along with new rules having been released by Twitter that outlined limitations on sharing real-time location information due to concerns about physical safety, indicating that slightly delayed information would be acceptable under the new policy. According to the Washington Post, Sweeney then asked Musk how long of a data feed delay was required to comply with new rules, but the ElonJet account was re-suspended by the evening of the same day. Sweeney's personal Twitter account was also blocked, along with all of his other accounts that tracked private flights of public figures and Russian oligarchs. On December 15, the Twitter account of rival social network Mastodon was also blocked, for tweeting about the situation. According to The Verge, "it appears Twitter counts a link to @ElonJet's Mastodon account as a violation" of their newest policy against linking to third-party URLs that provide real-time travel information. The accounts of multiple journalists who frequently cover the technology industry were also banned for reporting on the issue.

Legal threats
On December 14, 2022, Musk announced he would be taking legal action against Sweeney. On the same evening, Musk alleged in a tweet that a "crazy stalker" had followed a car carrying his 2-year-old son. The incident is claimed to have occurred in Los Angeles, in which the accused individual "blocked [the] car from moving" and "climbed onto [the] hood" according to Musk.  While Sweeney has posted publicly available information about Musk's private jets, flights, and airports used, Sweeney has not shared information about Musk's family members or Musk's cars. A Los Angeles Police detective in the stalking investigations unit said the unit had no evidence indicating the alleged stalker had used ElonJet. Regarding the incident, South Pasadena police said they were investigating a report of "an assault with a deadly weapon involving a vehicle", and labelled a member of Musk's security team as a "suspect". The statement also mentioned that "At no time during the incident did the victim identify the suspect or indicate the altercation was anything more than coincidental".

Vice News reported the moves were part of Musk's "most confusing and publicly volatile series of events yet", considering it disturbing to ban accounts that he promised would remain active, creating rules to justify the ban, and threatening legal action against a 20-year-old.

Sweeney stated that despite the legal threats, he does not plan to stop monitoring Musk's airplane travel and will continue publishing the flight-tracking information by using other social media platforms, including on his new Mastodon account. One day later, on December 15, Twitter suspended the accounts of nine journalists of national news organizations without warning, as part of what was referred to as the "Thursday Night Massacre", after they had posted links to the ElonJet account or similar jet trackers. Musk claimed reporters had doxxed him and his family, and alleged that, by covering the ElonJet story, they were linking to real-time flight information, which is "basically assassination coordinates" according to Musk.

References

External links
 
 
 ElonJet on Mastodon
  (suspended)
 ElonJetNextDay on Twitter

Elon Musk
Twitter accounts
Twitter controversies
Internet bots